Serhiy Ralyuchenko (born 13 November 1962 in Kyiv) is a Ukrainian professional football coach and a former player.

He is father of Andriy Ralyuchenko.

External links

1962 births
Living people
Footballers from Kyiv
Soviet footballers
Soviet expatriate footballers
Ukrainian footballers
Ukrainian expatriate footballers
Expatriate footballers in Poland
Ukrainian expatriate sportspeople in Poland
FC Nyva Vinnytsia players
FC Zirka Kropyvnytskyi players
SKA Kiev players
FC Shakhtar Donetsk players
FC Metalist Kharkiv players
Stal Mielec players
Stilon Gorzów Wielkopolski players
FC Torpedo Zaporizhzhia players
FC Temp Shepetivka players
FC Skala Stryi (1911) players
FC Vorskla Poltava players
FC Naftovyk-Ukrnafta Okhtyrka players
FC Zirka-2 Kirovohrad players
FC Enerhetyk Komsomolske players
FC Bilshovyk Kyiv players
Ukrainian Premier League players
Ukrainian football managers
FC Metalist 1925 Kharkiv managers
Association football midfielders
Soviet Top League players